Thomas Lee Judge (October 12, 1934 – September 8, 2006) was an American politician who served as the 18th governor of Montana from 1973 to 1981. A member of the Democratic Party, he previously served as the 25th lieutenant governor of Montana from 1969 to 1973.

Biography
Judge was born in Helena, Montana. He earned a bachelor's degree in journalism from the University of Notre Dame and did his graduate study at the University of Louisville. He graduated from the United States Army Adjutant General School at Fort Benjamin Harrison, Indiana.

Judge married Carol Anderson in 1966. The couple had two sons, Thomas Warren Judge and Patrick Lane Judge. The Judges, who were serving as governor and first lady of Montana, separated in the fall of 1979 and divorced during the winter of 1980. Judge then married his second wife, Suzan Koch, in 1981. Judge and Koch separated in 2003.

Career
Judge was a second lieutenant in the US Army and a captain in the US Army Adjutant General Corps and in the US Army Reserves from 1958 to 1964. In 1960, he became president and owner of a public relations firm.

Judge served in the Montana House of Representatives from 1961 to 1967 and in the Montana Senate from 1967 to 1969, and as 22nd Lieutenant Governor of Montana from 1969 to 1973.

In 1972, when incumbent Governor of Montana Forrest Anderson declined to run for a second term, Judge ran to succeed him. He defeated several opponents in the Democratic primary, and advanced to the general election, where he comfortably defeated Republican nominee Ed Smith, a rancher and legislator from Dagmar, Montana. Judge was 38 years old at the time of his election as governor.

When Judge ran for re-election in 1976, he was opposed by State Attorney General Bob Woodahl, whom he defeated in a landslide. He ran for re-election for a third consecutive term in 1980, but was defeated in the Democratic primary by his lieutenant governor, Ted Schwinden, who went on to win the general election. During his tenure as governor, Judge served on the executive committee of the National Governors Association and was chair of the Western Governors Conference.

When Schwinden declined to seek re-election to a third term in 1988, Judge ran to succeed him, and won a competitive and crowded Democratic primary. In the general election, Stan Stephens, the former President of the Montana Senate and the Republican nominee, defeated Judge by a slim margin.

Death
Judge died in Chandler, Arizona, on September 8, 2006, at the age of 71.  He is interred at Resurrection Cemetery in Helena, Montana.

References

External links
The Political Graveyard
National Governors Association

Montana Historical Society

1934 births
2006 deaths
Democratic Party governors of Montana
Democratic Party Montana state senators
Democratic Party members of the Montana House of Representatives
Military personnel from Montana
People from Chandler, Arizona
Politicians from Helena, Montana
Lieutenant Governors of Montana
Deaths from respiratory failure
Deaths from pulmonary fibrosis
20th-century American politicians
Catholics from Arizona
Catholics from Montana
University of Notre Dame alumni